Aleksey Ivanovich Aleksandrov (born 3 May 1952 in Leningrad, Soviet Union) is a Russian lawyer, businessman, and politician.

In 1993–2003 he was a deputy of the State Duma first from Our Home – Russia then from Unity and then United Russia. Since 2004, he has been the representative of the legislative assembly of Kaluga Oblast in the Federation Council of Russia.

Biography 
He was born on 3 May 1952 in Leningrad. Father is economist, mother is librarian.

Since childhood, Aleksandrov dreamed of becoming a lawyer, from 1968 he studied at the School of Young Lawyer at the Leningrad State University, where he attended lectures by outstanding lawyers, professors Alekseeva, Krylova, Lukashevich, Elkind, judges Ermakova, prosecutor Solovyov, lawyer Kiselyov.

He founded the insurance company Rus which held a stake in the September 1990 founding of the regional committee bank Bank Rossiya which in 1991 became a joint venture.

Honours and awards
 Order of Merit for the Fatherland, 4th class (19 November 2007) - for services in regulatory affairs, strengthening and development of the Russian state
 Medal of the Order "For Merit to the Fatherland", 2nd class (21 September 2002) - for services to strengthen the rule of law, an active law-making and long-term diligent work
 Jubilee Medal "300 Years of the Russian Navy" (1996)
 Medal "In Commemoration of the 850th Anniversary of Moscow" (1997)
 Medal "In Commemoration of the 300th Anniversary of Saint Petersburg" (2003)
 Merited Lawyer of the Russian Federation (18 December 1996) - for services to strengthen the rule of law and many years of honest work
 Honour the Russian FSB

References

1952 births
Living people
Businesspeople  from Saint Petersburg
Lawyers from Saint Petersburg
Our Home – Russia politicians
Members of the Federation Council of Russia (after 2000)
Recipients of the Medal of the Order "For Merit to the Fatherland" II class
20th-century Russian politicians
21st-century Russian politicians
20th-century Russian lawyers
21st-century Russian lawyers
First convocation members of the State Duma (Russian Federation)
Second convocation members of the State Duma (Russian Federation)
Third convocation members of the State Duma (Russian Federation)